Frits Bührman (27 August 1904 – 5 February 1930) was a Dutch athlete. He competed in the men's high jump at the 1928 Summer Olympics.

References

External links
 

1904 births
1930 deaths
Athletes (track and field) at the 1928 Summer Olympics
Dutch male high jumpers
Olympic athletes of the Netherlands
Place of birth missing